In particle physics the Froissart bound, or Froissart limit, is a generic constraint that the total scattering cross section of two colliding high-energy particles cannot increase faster than , with c a normalization constant and s the square of the center-of-mass energy (s is one of the three Mandelstam variables).

Further reading

The Froissart bound on scholarpedia, by M. Froissart

References

Scattering theory